The Blue Moon is a 1920 American silent drama film directed by George L. Cox and starring Pell Trenton, Elinor Field, Harry Northrup and Herbert Standing. The film was adapted from the novel by David Anderson.

Cast
 Pell Trenton as The Pearl Hunter 
 Elinor Field as Wild Rose 
 Harry Northrup as The Man with the Fancy Vest 
 James Gordon as The River Boss 
 Margaret McWade as The Iron-gray Woman 
 Herbert Standing as The Wild Man 
 Sidney Franklin as Louie Solomon 
 Frederick Monley as The Sheriff

References

External links

1920 films
1920 drama films
Silent American drama films
Films directed by George L. Cox
American silent feature films
1920s English-language films
Pathé Exchange films
American black-and-white films
1920s American films